Rock Chapel may refer to:

Chapel on the Rock, a popular tourist landmark in Allenspark, Colorado, United States
Chapel Rock, New Zealand
Farmington Rock Chapel, built between 1861 and 1863 in the town of Farmington, Utah, United States
Rock chapel (Všemily), a rock chapel in the Czech Republic
Little Rock Chapel Falls, a high horsetail ribbon waterfall in Hamilton, Ontario, Canada
William Miller Chapel and Ascension Rock, a historic district in New York, United States
Rock-hewn Churches of Ivanovo
Rock Chapel (Georgia), area around the Rock Chapel Mountain quarries in Lithonia, Georgia, United States